Qəzli or Gazli or Kozly or Kazeli or Kezli may refer to:
Qəzli, Ismailli, Azerbaijan
Qəzli, Sabirabad, Azerbaijan
Qezli, Iran, a village in Golestan Province, Iran
Gezeli (disambiguation), places in Iran
Gazli, Uzbekistan

For places in Poland, see Kozły (disambiguation).